Reno County Area Transit, known as Rcat, provides public transportation for the citizens of Reno County, Kansas. Fixed route and paratransit operations serve urban Hutchinson and South Hutchinson. A more flexible service, which requires 24 hours advance notice, is provided for the rural communities of the county, with a free transfer to city routes.

References

External links
http://www.renogov.org/rcat/
Reno County Area Transportation Facility

Bus transportation in Kansas